Aleksej Aleksandrov (born 11 May 1973) is a Belarusian chess player. He was awarded the title Grandmaster by FIDE in 1997. Aleksandrov is a five-time Belarusian champion and played on the Belarusian national team at the Chess Olympiad, the World Team Chess Championship and the European Team Chess Championship. He competed in the FIDE World Championship in 1998, 1999, 2000 and 2004, and in the FIDE World Cup in 2017.

Selected tournament results

 1991: Victory at the USSR Junior Chess Championship
 1992: Victory at the European Junior Chess Championship
 1996: Victory at the Belarusian Chess Championship, Victory at Gistrup
 1998: Victory at a tournament in Kstovo
 2000: Second at European Individual Chess Championship
 2000: Victory at the Petroff Memorial in St. Petersburg
 2001: Victory at the 17th open at Bad Wörishofen
 2002: Shared victory at the Aeroflot Open in Moscow
 2003: Shared victory at the Aeroflot Open in Moscow
 2005: Victory at Inautomarket Open in Minsk
 2007: Victory at the Belarusian Chess Championship and at the European Rapid Chess Championship in Warsaw
 2008: Shared victory at the President's Cup in Baku
 2009: Victory at the Abu Dhabi Chess Festival
 2009: Victory at the Al Saleh 8th International Open in Yemen
 2011: Victory at the 3rd Orissa International GM Open Chess Tournament
 2012: Victory at Mumbai

Notes

External links

1973 births
Living people
Chess grandmasters
Belarusian chess players
Chess Olympiad competitors
Place of birth missing (living people)